Percy Nilegård is a fictional character played by Johan Rheborg since 1991, and one of the primary staples of the Swedish comedy group Killinggänget. 

As a vain, snobbish, and possibly insane businessman with a noticeable underbite, he does almost everything to earn money while also promoting his own ideas of "good taste". Nilegård, whose worldview is very ignorant in general, has a tendency to insert (sometimes poorly worded) English words and phrases into his speech, primarily to describe management and corporate-related concepts, a tendency which makes his character somewhat reminiscent of the Swedish yuppie culture in the late 1980's.

I manegen med Glenn Killing (In the ring with Glenn Killing) 1992

Percy is the producer of a talent-spot show hosted by Glenn Killing on which he makes frequent appearances. There he promotes his own brand of toothpaste called "Niledent" and hosts a short segment called "the guide to the  Sweden" in which he guides the viewer to his vision of Sweden, including what is "good" art and the significance of subway color-codes on social classes.

Nilecity 105,6 1994

Percy owns a small radio-station located above a fire-department with Glenn as the primary radio-host. In his quest to get rich he tries numerous schemes including airing advertisements for companies and asking them for payments afterwards, a concept which he calls "marketing by not asking any questions first" and which meets with little success. He also runs a mock charity-drive for poor children in Rinkeby.

The male head of the fire-department also develops a crush on him, courting him in various manners. Percy is not happy when he finally reveals his feelings.

Percy tårar (Tears of Percy) 1996

Having left Glenn behind, Percy goes into psychotherapy where he meets Dr J Tull (played by the same actor as Glenn) who listens to the tale of how he - along with his new side-kick Tommy Bohlin - exploited the new boss of an old family-run brewery.

Torsk på Tallinn (Screwed in Tallinn) 1999

Percy runs a travel-agency for lonely men who travel abroad to meet potential wives. He takes them to a shoddy hotel in Tallinn, Estonia, where things get complicated.

Glenn Killing på Grand, 2000
Now in a bad financial situation, Percy and his new business partner make an appearance on stage for a small musical performance. In return, Glenn offers them a hot meal.

Trivia
Percy usually drives or travels in American cars, including a 4-door Cadillac, a Buick Electra station-wagon, a Chevrolet Van and - in one case - a Lincoln Limo.

Nilegard, Percy
Nilegard, Percy
Nilegard, Percy
Nilegard, Percy
Nilegard, Percy